Lysiatychi is a village (selo) in Stryi Raion, Lviv Oblast in western Ukraine. It belongs to Stryi urban hromada, one of the hromadas of Ukraine. Local government is administered by Lysiatytska village council.

Geography 
The village is large and has an area of 25,56 km2 and is currently living in the village of about 1791 persons.

History 
The first record of the village dates back to 1443 year. Lysiatychi has been town, as testified and town hall, and a large Jewish colony. The town  had possessed  arable land in 1785.

Attractions 
The village has two churches: 
 Church of the Nativity of Christ 1874 (Wooden).
 St. Nicholas Church, located in the former indoors Roman Catholic Church (1903, stone).

Gallery

Famous people
Ivan Franko visited the village Lysiatychi and has written about it in his poem "Rusyn traveling with Trouble" (Vandrivka Rusyna z Bidoyu).

References

External links 
  “Фортуна” 3 січня 2015p. “Любіть своє село всім серцем, усією душею”
  weather.in.ua
 Книги Василя Лаби - Історія населених пунктів. 2009 рік. 9. Історія села Лисятичі від найдавніших часів до 1939 року. – Львів, 2009, 120 с

Literature 
  Page 835

Villages in Stryi Raion